The Fresno River Viaduct is a bridge to carry California High-Speed Rail over Route 145, the Fresno River, and Raymond Road in Madera County, California. The bridge was completed in 2018 It is the first permanent structure constructed as part of California High-Speed Rail. The bridge site is located just east of the city limits of Madera, California, approximately 20 miles northwest of the planned Fresno high-speed rail station, and approximately 10 miles southeast of the planned Chowchilla Wye. Because the site is downstream of the John Franchi Diversion Dam, the riverbed is normally dry unless heavy rains cause the dam to overtop. The bridge will be 1600 feet long and 25 feet high, and will run parallel to the BNSF Railway bridge over the Fresno River.

Construction 
Construction began in June 2015. Initial work consisted of assembling rebar cages for the bridge columns and pouring concrete. In August 2015, temporary cofferdams were erected to excavate sand to construct the bridge's structural supports. By the end of October 2015, the work on the piles had ended and the rebar skeletons of the 16 columns had been erected.

In late March 2016, concrete began to be poured for the bridge's superstructure. In October 2016, the final span of the bridge was being constructed and the rest of the deck was complete, with preparations commencing for installation of the deck's barrier wall.

A year later, in September 2017, the bridge's structure was largely complete, although track and electrical work remained for a future phase of construction.

References

External links
 Fresno River Viaduct – California High-Speed Rail

California High-Speed Rail
Railroad bridges in California
Buildings and structures in Madera County, California
Concrete bridges in California
Viaducts in the United States
Buildings and structures under construction in the United States